The Quiriquina Formation is a geological formation in Chile whose strata date back to the Late Cretaceous. Dinosaur remains are among the fossils that have been recovered from the formation. The glauconitic sandstones and conglomerates of the formation were deposited in a marine environment.

Vertebrate paleofauna 

 Aristonectes quiriquinensis
 Australobaena chilensis
 Neogaeornis wetzeli
 Belonostomus longirostris
 Ischyrhiza chilensis
 Wunyelfia maulensis
 Cimoliasaurus sp.
 Pliosaurus sp.

See also 
 Arauco Basin
 Dorotea Formation
 List of dinosaur-bearing rock formations
 Quiriquina Island

References

Further reading 
 H.-V. Karl and G. Tichy. 2002. Australobaena chilensis n. gen. n. sp., and the homology of secondary palatines in marine turtles (Anapsida: Testudines). Studia Geologica Salmanticensia 38:11-19
 Mario E. Suárez, Henri Cappetta. 2004. Sclerorhynchid teeth from the Late Cretaceous of the Quiriquina Formation
 M. E. Suarez and O. Fritis. 2002. Nuevo registro de Aristonectes sp. (Plesiosauroidea incertae sedis) del Cretácico Tardío de la Formación Quiriquina, Cocholgüe, Chile. Boletín de la Sociedad de Biología de Concepción 73:87-93

Geologic formations of Chile
Maastrichtian Stage of South America
Cretaceous Chile
Sandstone formations
Fossiliferous stratigraphic units of South America
Paleontology in Chile
Geology of Biobío Region
Mapuche language